Chimán is a district (distrito) of Panamá Province in Panama. The population according to the 2000 census was 4,086; the latest official estimate (for 2019) is 3,531. The district covers a total area of 1,046 km². The capital lies at the town of Chimán.

Administrative divisions
Chimán District is divided administratively into the following corregimientos:

Chimán (capital)
Brujas
Gonzalo Vásquez
Pásiga
Unión Santeña

References

Districts of Panamá Province